Arae in Numidia (also spelled Aræ in Numidia) was an Ancient city and bishopric in Roman Africa, which remains a Latin Catholic titular see.

Its modern location is presumed in present Algeria.

History 
The city was important enough in the Roman province of Numidia to become one of its many suffragan bishoprics, but like most faded.

Titular see 
The diocese was nominally restored in the 20th century as a Latin Catholic titular bishopric (also named Are di Numidia in Curiate Italian).

It has had the following incumbents, of the fitting episcopal (lowest) rank and of the intermediary (archiepiscopal) rank :
 Titular Bishop José Gabriel Diaz Cueva(1964.01.13 – 1968.06.26)
 Titular Archbishop Endre Hamvas (1969.01.10 – 1970.04.04)
 Titular Bishop José Gea Escolano (1971.03.25 – 1976.09.10)
 Titular Archbishop Martino Giusti (1984.05.24 – 1987.12.01)
 Titular Bishop John Gabriel (1988.01.30 – 1989.12.07)
 Titular  Bishop Thomas Dabre (1990.04.02 – 1998.05.22)
 Titular Archbishop Paul Dahdah, Discalced Carmelites (O.C.D.) (1999.07.30 – ), Apostolic Vicar of Beirut (Lebanon)

See also 
 Arae in Mauretania
 Catholic Church in Algeria

References

External links 
 GCatholic with titular incumbent bio links

Catholic titular sees in Africa